The list of ship launches in 2003 includes a chronological list of all ships launched in 2003.


References

See also 

2003
Ship launches